Lillian Spender (usually known as Mrs. John Kent Spender; 22 February 1835 – 4 May 1895) was an English writer. She contributed to major English reviews and turned later to novel-writing.

Early years and education
Lillian (known informally as Lily) Headland was born on 22 February 1835 as the daughter of Edward Headland, a well-known physician of Portland Place, London. Her mother was the daughter of Ferdinand de Medina, a Spaniard. Spender was educated at Queen's College, Harley Street.

Career
In 1858, she married John Kent Spender, physician to the Mineral Water Hospital, Bath.

After her marriage, Spender turned her attention to literature. She contributed to the London Quarterly Review, the English Woman's Journal, the Dublin University Review, the British Quarterly Review, and a magazine called Meliora, but after 1869, she mainly wrote novels. She was active in education and social work in Bath until her health failed.

Lillian Spender died at Bath on 4 May 1895. Seven of Spender's eight children survived her. Two of her sons, J. A. Spender and Harold Spender, became London journalists.

Selected works
Brothers-in-Law (1869)
Her Own Fault (1871)
Parted Lives (1873)
Jocelyn's Mistake (1875)
Mark Eylmer's Revenge (1876)
Both in the Wrong (1878)
Godwyn's Ordeal (1879)
Till Death Us Do Part (1881)
Gabrielle de Bourdaine (1882)
Mr. Nobody (1884)
The Recollections of a Country Doctor (1885)
Trust Me: A Novel (1886)
Her Brother's Keeper: A Novel (1887)
Kept Secret (1888)
Lady Hazelton's Confession (1890)
A Waking (1892)
A Strange Temptation (1893)
A Modern Quixote (1894)

References

Sources
 

1835 births
1895 deaths
19th-century English women writers
19th-century British writers
English women novelists
Victorian novelists
Victorian women writers
Pseudonymous women writers
19th-century pseudonymous writers